"Another Day of Sun" is the opening number from the 2016 musical film La La Land.  The ensemble number portrays drivers in a Los Angeles traffic jam on a highway ramp singing and dancing about their aspirations to succeed in Hollywood.  The song was filmed on location on a 130-foot-high express ramp of the Judge Harry Pregerson Interchange in three shots, edited with hidden cuts to give the illusion of a single six-minute take. The song was composed by Justin Hurwitz with lyrics by Benj Pasek and Justin Paul, and choreography by Mandy Moore.

Composition and lyrics 
Hurwitz noted the tension in the song between the aspirations of the singers and the uncertain outcome of their efforts, noting "It’s an optimistic song, but it’s also about unfulfilled dreams."  Paul said, "You pursue that dream, and you go to bed and get up the next day, and it’s a gorgeous day.  It encourages you in one breath, and in another breath doesn’t acknowledge that you just failed miserably. You wake up and it doesn’t match your mood. It’s a bright and shiny day."

The song is written in the key of E major, with a tempo of 126 beats per minute.  It generally follows an A–B–Cm–Gm chord progression, and has a vocal range for the various parts of G3–C5.  Hurwitz composed the song with a fast-paced tempo predominantly using major keys, but often using minor keys as well, making it "more bittersweet than it may seem on its face" according to Hurwitz.  The song also has densely layered background vocals and a full 95-piece orchestra and 40-person choir.  Hurwitz tried to feature different elements of the orchestration as the visuals followed different members of the ensemble.

Shooting and choreography 

The sequence – the first of the film to be shot – was filmed over two days in August 2015. The song was filmed on a 130-foot-high express ramp of the Judge Harry Pregerson Interchange between the Harbor Freeway (Interstate 110) and the Glenn Anderson Freeway (Interstate 105) in South Los Angeles.  The ramp was closed for the two full days of filming.  The rest of the highway was left open, so that normal traffic is visible in the background. The sequence was initially planned to be on a ground-level ramp, but it was changed to the interchange to give a sense of the vastness of the city.  Director Damien Chazelle also likened the number's location on a highway to the Yellow Brick Road in The Wizard of Oz.

The number was shot in three takes, which were edited to give the appearance of a single six-minute long take.  Moore spent between three and four months preparing for the shoot, which involved over 60 cars, 30 dancers, and 100 extras.  The number was choreographed with a single dancer at its beginning, with other dancers joining in incrementally, to avoid having everyone abruptly start dancing at once.  The ensemble also included several stunt performers.  Initial rehearsals with ten dancers occurred in a studio parking lot using about 20 staff members' cars.

The number was initially planned to be preceded by an overture, but during editing it was found that this slowed the opening too much. Film editor Tom Cross noted that Chazelle "realized that for people to accept that it's a musical, you have to announce it confidently at the beginning," and that displaying the film's title on the final beat of the song caused to serve as an overture itself.

On screen, dancer Reshma Gajjar appears to sing the opening lines (and several others after that), but the lead female vocals were actually provided by vocalist Angela Parrish, who doesn't appear in the film.  The filmmakers had hoped to find a woman "who could both sing and dance on camera" to launch the opening number, but ended up finding their dancer first and then had to conduct separate auditions for a vocalist during post-production in the spring of 2016.

Other performances 
The cold open of the 74th Golden Globe Awards in January 2017 featured a musical parody of "Another Day of Sun", "City of Stars", and "Planetarium" from La La Land, with altered lyrics.  The "Another Day of Sun" segment featured limousines in a traffic jam en route to the awards, with the dance routine performed by characters from several works nominated for the awards that year.  It was performed by host Jimmy Fallon and featured cameos by Nicole Kidman, Amy Adams, John Travolta, Sarah Paulson, Rami Malek, Kit Harington, and others.

It is performed by the Italian singer Mina, published by Sony Music and PDU on 9 February 2018. Also in The Masked Singer (British series 3), Firework, Mushroom, Lionfish (as Will Young), Doughnuts, and Robobunny perform it to open Episode 3.

Charts

Certifications

See also 
 Audition (The Fools Who Dream)
 City of Stars

References 

2016 songs
Songs written for films
Songs written by Justin Paul (songwriter)
Songs written by Benj Pasek
Songs with music by Justin Hurwitz
Songs from La La Land

ja:アナザー・デイ・オブ・サン